1066: The Battle for Middle Earth is a two-part British television documentary series. In this blend of historical drama and original source material, Channel 4 re-imagines the story of this decisive year of the Norman conquest of England, not from the saddles of kings and conquerors, but through the eyes of ordinary people caught up in its events. The documentary was narrated by actor Sir Ian Holm.

The series focuses on the Sussex village of Crowhurst, which Director Justin Hardy learned about from the Domesday Book, England's earliest surviving public record. Located between the coast and Hastings, the little village was, according to the book, "laid to waste" in 1066. In the series, it serves as the hometown for the fictional peasant soldiers Tofi, Leofric, and Ordgar, whose names are actual Anglo-Saxon names from the period. Viewers may assume that the programme's title refers to The Lord of the Rings books, but Hardy chose "Middle Earth" because Anglo-Saxons frequently used the term to describe their world. He notes that J. R. R. Tolkien, an Oxford professor of Anglo-Saxon, used it, along with other Anglo-Saxon words, for the same reasons.

References

External links

1066 - Channel 4

2009 British television series debuts
2009 British television series endings
2000s British documentary television series
British military television series
Channel 4 documentary series
Television shows set in Sussex
English-language television shows